Tim Driscoll is an American football coach. He is the defensive coordinator at the University of North Carolina at Pembroke. Driscoll served as the head football coach at Finlandia University in Hancock, Michigan from 2015 to 2017.

Head coaching record

References

Year of birth missing (living people)
Living people
Finlandia Lions football coaches
Fort Lewis Skyhawks football coaches
Jamestown Jimmies football coaches
Minnesota Crookston Golden Eagles football coaches
North Dakota State Bison football coaches
Northern Michigan Wildcats football coaches
UNC Pembroke Braves football coaches
High school football coaches in Utah